WZDQ (102.3 FM, "102.3 The Rocket") is a radio station broadcasting an active rock music format. Licensed to Humboldt, Tennessee, United States, the station serves the Jackson, Tennessee, area.  The station is currently owned by Thomas Radio, LLC.

History
The station was assigned the call letters WZDQ on January 10, 1982.  On June 3, 1985, the station changed its call sign to WIRJ-FM then on October 20, 1985, back to the current call-letters WZDQ, as "Q102".,

References

External links

ZDQ
Active rock radio stations in the United States